Fredericus Amos (Frits) Lambrechts (born 24 March 1937) is a Dutch actor, musician and cabaret artist.

Career
He started with cabaret. He was discovered in 1964 by writer and comedian Jaap Van de Merwe. After seeing him perform in Amsterdam, Van der Merwe hired him and made him participate as pianist to his performances. After his collaboration with Van de Merwe, he worked with Wim Kan and Henk Elsink, among others. Thereafter he was active in music, singing and acting. In 1971 he was awarded a Zilveren Harp for his contribution to the Dutch song. Lambrechts was a contributor to the satirical radio program Cursief in the early 1970s.

From November 1984 to December 1993 Lambrechts was Hoofdpiet in television programs about Sinterklaas. He later gave up portraying the character, which was taken over by Erik de Vogel. Between 1991 and 2010 he dubbed Tigger in the Dutch dubbing of the Winnie the Pooh cartoons. In the 1990s he appeared in television commercials for Gamma. He had a recurring role in Goede tijden, slechte tijden, and appeared as Meeuwse in All Stars. In the film and television series The Flying Liftboy he had an important supporting role as Jozias Tump. He later dubbed Mater in the film series Cars (from 2006) and the main character Carl Fredricksen in Up (2009).

In 2003 Lambrechts received a Gouden Beelden for Best Actor. He was awarded this prize for his role as a mildly demented elderly man in Sloophamer.

In 2015 he participated in the play Frits! Laten we lastig zijn.

Between 2017 and 2019 he was featured in the television series Het geheime dagboek van Hendrik Groen. In 2020 and 2021, he played Frank Lammers' father in Jumbo commercials. In 2021, he had a guest role in the third season of TV series Mocro Maffia (televisieserie).

Filmography

Film and television 
 De inbreker (1972) - detective van Hol  (Stoere)
 Waaldrecht (TV series) - Willem Barnhoorn (episode Taxi Meneer?, 1973)
 Twee onder een klap (TV series) - Bob Jongeneel (1973)
 Boerin in Frankrijk (TV series) - Kees (1973)
 Zwaarmoedige verhalen voor bij de centrale verwarming - Gerrie in part 3: Zeeman tussen wal en schip (1975)
 Hollands Glorie (TV series) - Machinist Verwoert (1976) 
 Cassata (TV series) - Kees (episodes 1–8, 1979)
 De brandnetelkoning (TV-docudrama) - Chemical factory worker Frans Messing, (1979)
 De Lemmings (TV series) (1980) - Toon
 Het oponthoud (televisiefilm, 1982) - Garage owner
 Het wonder van Rotterdam (1984) - Uncredited
 De ijssalon (1985) - NSB party guy
 Thomas en Senior (TV series) - Crook Karel (3 episodes, 1985)
 Geef je ouders maar weer de schuld - Father Nol (1985-1986)
 Het wassende water (TV series) - auctioneer Klaas Merkesteijn (1 episode, 1986)
 Sinterklaas in Sesamstraat (NPS, 1987–1993, 1995) - Hoofdpiet (1995)
 Alfred J. Kwak (TV series) - Henk de Mol (1989-1991, stem)
 Medisch Centrum West (TV series) - Joop (1990)
 Goede tijden, slechte tijden (TV series) - Willem Kelder (1990-1991, 1993)
 Beertje Sebastiaan: De geheime opdracht (1991) - Snuffie (voice)
 Vrienden voor het leven - Mr Van Steunzolen (episode 12 ambachten, 1992)
 Ha, die Pa! (TV series) - Gijs (episode Eindexamen, 1992)
 Coverstory (TV series) - Inspector Pieters (episode 1.8, 1993)
 Het zonnetje in huis (TV series) - Man in waiting room (episode Moederschap, 1994)
 Het zonnetje in huis (TV series) - Video store owner (episode Bandenpech, 1996)
 SamSam (TV series) - Hennie (episode Riet is er niet, 1994)
 Flodder (TV series) - (episode  De hondlanger, 1995)
 Baantjer (TV series) - Schubben Sjakie (episode De Cock en de moord op de marktmeester, 1996)
 Flodder (TV series) - Harco Sorbato (episode Vrijdag de 13e, 1997)
 Ik ben je moeder niet (TV series) - Jan (episode De zus van Trudy, 1996)
 All Stars (1997) - Meeuwse
 Zeeuws Meisje (TV series) - Pa Hielke (1998)
 Abeltje (1998) - Jozias Tump
 Somberman's actie (1999) - Rinie Kaak
 Spangen (TV series) - Kobus Visser (episode Rio, 1999)
 De rode zwaan (1999) - Uncredited
 Russen (TV series) - Fons de Knecht (episode Taxi, 2000)
 The Flying Liftboy (TV series) - Jozias Tump (2000)
 Minoes (2001) - Joop (voice)
 Kees & Co (2001) - Oom Leo (episode "Luister en huiver", 2001)
 The Champ (2002) - Mr. Hemming
 Ja zuster, nee zuster (2002) - Grandpa
 Sloophamer (Television film, 2003) - Dirk van den Berg
 Van God Los (2003) - Van de Velde
 Baantjer (TV series) - Eef de Beer (episode De Cock en de moord op Arie Bombarie, 2004)
 Pluk van de petteflet (2004) - Heen- en Weerwolf (stem)
 Opruiming (2005) - Man
 Het woeden der gehele wereld (2006) - Uncredited
 Nachtrit (2006) - Uncredited
 Leer Effe Fietsen (2006) - Grandpa
 Van Speijk (TV series) - Mr. Horstman (3 episodes., 2006–2007)
 Oppassen!!! (TV series, 2009) - kastelein (1 episode)
 De laatste reis van meneer Van Leeuwen (telefilm, 2010) - Mr Van Leeuwen
 Flikken Maastricht (2011) - Arnout
 Sonny Boy (2011) - Sam
 All Stars 2: Old Stars (2011) - Meeuwse
 Koning van Katoren (2012) - Janus
 Aaf (TV series, 2013) - Grandpa, Ton's father
 Nooit te oud (Television film, 2013) - Elderly person in wheelchair
 Hartenstraat (2014) -
 Het geheime dagboek van Hendrik Groen (TV series, 2017–2019) - Mr Hoogdalen
 Dokter Tinus - Fred Pot (2013, 2017)
 Komt een man bij de dokter (2020)
 Mocro Maffia - Kees (2021)

Animation 
 Rocco, the gorilla in Eiland Van Noach, Het
 Tigger in Winnie the Pooh until when replaced by Kees van Lier
 Gus in Cinderella
 Louie in TaleSpin
 Dodger in Oliver & Company
 Prop in Prop en Bertha
 Sir Rothbart in The Swan Princess
 Sniffy in Sebastian Star Bear: First Mission
 Aard Appel in Aard Appel en Krieltje
 Wilbur in The Rescuers Down Under
 Mater in Cars, Cars 2, Cars 3, Mater and the Ghostlight 
 Bloat in Finding Nemo and Finding Dory
 Scrapperton in Super Robot Monkey Team Hyperforce Go!
 Henk the mole in Alfred J. Kwak 
 Flip in Little Nemo: Adventures in Slumberland
 Smokey in Stuart Little
 Carl Fredricksen in Up
 Carl Fredericksen in Dug's Special Mission
 The Lorax in The Lorax
 Cookie in Atlantis: The Lost Empire and Atlantis: Milo's Return
 Captain Frank in the 2005 Race naar de maan

Plays and musicals  
 Bagage (Stage and music with zZz)
 Python
 Grace
 Monument voor mijn vader
 Krapuul
 De Zonnebloem
 Jona de NEE zegger
 Kruimeltje
 Bulletje & Bonestaak
 De Kleine Kapitein
 De brief voor de koning
 Brandende liefde
 Willeke de musical
 Mike & Thomas Kerstrevue 2012
 Zeldzaam 1988
 1000 Wishes (for KiKa with PBII)

References

1937 births
Dutch cabaret performers
Dutch pianists
Dutch male film actors
Dutch male television actors
Dutch male voice actors
20th-century Dutch male actors
21st-century Dutch male actors
Male actors from Amsterdam
Dutch singers
Living people